Nandpur is a small village in Jamnagar, Gujarat, India. The road to it is from Kalavad to Ranuja, Dhutarpur, Bajrangpur, Vijaypur, Bharatpur Nandpur and from Dhrol to Falla, Ranjitpar, Jamwanthali, Nandpur. Most people there are farmers. Some of them are connected with animal husbandry.

History 
Nandpur Village was reestablished from old Locality named Virpur in 1982 due to the new construction of Und dem on the river of Und

Statistics
Population (approx): 1600
Buildings (approx): 142
Temples: 4
Shops: 8
Primary School: 1

Co-ordinates
Nandpur Village Is Located At  On Globe.

References

External links

Villages in Jamnagar district